Conoryctella was a genus of taeniodont cimolestans.

References 

Cimolestans
Prehistoric mammal genera